Odiel Van Den Meersschaut (25 December 1919 – 16 March 1993) was a Belgian racing cyclist. He won the Belgian national road race title in 1940.

References

External links
 

1919 births
1993 deaths
Belgian male cyclists
People from Merelbeke
Cyclists from East Flanders